The St. Louis Cardinals, a professional baseball franchise based in St. Louis, Missouri, compete in the National League (NL) of Major League Baseball (MLB).  Prior to entering the NL in 1892, they were also a member of the American Association (AA) from 1882 to 1891.  They have won 11 World Series titles as an NL team, one pre-World Series championship and tied another against the NL.  Since 1900, the team has been known as the Cardinals.  They were originally named the Perfectos.  Baseball teams like St. Louis employ a manager to make on-field decisions for the team during the game, similar to the head coach position of other sports.  A number of coaches report to the manager, including the bench coach, first and third base coaches, and pitching and hitting coaches, among other coaches and instructors. Mike Matheny, a former catcher for the Cardinals from 2000 to 2004, was the manager from 2012-2018, when he was relieved following a series of disputes, including allegations that he would not speak with Dexter Fowler. He was signed through 2017 and extended to the 2018 season when he was fired. The Cardinals hired bench coach Mike Shildt as interim manager.

Matheny is one of 63 total individuals who have managed the Cardinals, more than any other Major League franchise.  Between 1882 and 1918 – 37 total seasons – 37 different managers stayed the helm. Ned Cuthbert became the first manager of the then-Brown Stockings in 1882, serving for one season. Also an outfielder for a former St. Louis Brown Stockings club, he was directly responsible for bringing professional baseball back to St. Louis after a game-fixing scandal expelled the earlier team from the NL in 1877. He rallied a barnstorming team that attracted the attention of eventual owner Chris von der Ahe, who directly negotiated for the team to be a charter member of a new league, the AA, in 1882. Charles Comiskey was the first manager in franchise history to hold the position for multiple seasons.  He also owns the highest career winning percentage in franchise history at .673, four American Association pennants (1885–1888) and one interleague championship (before the official World Series existed).  He also held the record for most career wins in team history with from 1884 to 1945 (563 total) and games managed (852) until 1924.  However, von der Ahe changed managers more than any other owner in team history – a total of 27 in 19 season oversaw the team on the field.  After the Robison era began, stability marginally improved: nine managers in 20 years from 1899 to 1918. Jack McCloskey, Roger Bresnahan, and Miller Huggins each managed three or more seasons from 1906 to 1917, becoming the first group to manage multiple seasons in succession.

Branch Rickey, known mainly as a general manager, surpassed Comiskey's record for games managed in 1924, totaling 947 in seven seasons.  His replacement, Rogers Hornsby – also the second baseman who won two Triple Crowns and six consecutive batting titles – finally guided the Cardinals to their first modern World Series championship against the formidable New York Yankees, their first interleague championship in exactly 40 years. Sam Breadon, the Cardinals' owner, also frequently changed managers (although Frankie Frisch and Gabby Street both managed at least five seasons and won one World Series title apiece in the 1930s out of nine total managers in 30 seasons) until settling on Hall of Famer Billy Southworth from 1940 to 1945.

Southworth set new team records for games managed (981), wins (620) and World Series championships (two).  His Cardinals teams won 105 or more games each year from 1942 to 1944, winning the NL pennants in each of those three seasons.  His .642 winning percentage is second-highest in team history, and the highest since the Cardinals joined the National League.  Southworth was also awarded the Sporting News Manager of the Year Award in 1941 and 1942.  Starting in 1953 with the Gussie Busch/Anheuser-Busch era, thirteen managers captained the club in 43 seasons.  After Southworth, Eddie Dyer, Eddie Stanky, Fred Hutchinson and Johnny Keane also each took home a Sporting News Manager of the Year award.  Keane's 1964 team that year's World Series.  Hall of Famer Red Schoendienst took over from 1965 to 1977 and won one World Series and two NL pennants.  Schoendienst then broke Southworth's team records for games (1,999 total) and wins (1,041).  He also held records of 14 seasons managed and 955 losses.

In the 1980s, Hall of Famer Whitey Herzog's style of play known as Whiteyball pushed the Cardinals to three NL pennants and a World Series championship in 1982.  He was named the Sporting News Sportsman of the Year and Manager of the Year in 1982.  In 1990, Joe Torre took over and Tony La Russa succeeded him when the William DeWitt, Jr. ownership – still the current ownership – commenced in 1996.  La Russa finished with the longest tenure in franchise history (16 seasons), and leads Cardinals managers in wins (1,408), losses (1,182), playoff appearances (nine) and is tied for most World Series championships (two).  He also won three NL pennants.  Matheny took over from La Russa.  With DeWitt ‘s era, the Cardinals have seen their greatest period of managerial stability with just two managers.

Besides La Russa, eight Cardinals managers have won a modern World Series: Hornsby, Frisch, Street, Dyer, Southworth, Keane, Schoendienst and Herzog; Southworth and La Russa are the only ones to win two each.  Comiskey won one pre-World Series title and tied for another.  Cardinals managers inducted into the Baseball Hall of Fame include Comiskey, Tommy McCarthy, Roger Connor, Kid Nichols, Bresnahan, Huggins, Rickey, Hornsby, Bill McKechnie, Southworth, Frisch, Schoendienst, Herzog, Torre and La Russa.

Table key

Table of managers
Statistics current through 2022

References

Footnotes
  Although the American Association is considered a former Major League, the Cardinals' regular season records, postseason records and World Series championships attained since their entrance into the National League in 1892 are the official totals considered part of their official Major League achievements.
  The manager's number in the order of Cardinals managerial succession.  All managers with multiple terms have their totals tallied on a single line. 
  This line is the official total considered as St. Louis' all-time Major League record.  Their Major League won-loss total only counts the regular season, as postseason play is considered separately.

Source notes

Bibliography

Related lists

List of St. Louis Cardinals owners and executives
List of St. Louis Cardinals coaches
List of St. Louis Cardinals seasons

 
St. Louis Cardinals
Managers